The surname Dove has several origins. In some cases the surname is derived from the Middle English dove ("dove"), which is in turn derived from the Old English dūfe ("dove"), or possibly sometimes the Old Norse dúfa ("dove"). In this way, this surname originated as a nickname for a gentle person, or an occupational name for a person who worked with doves. In some cases, the surname Dove originated from the fact that the Middle English word was also used as a masculine and feminine personal name. 

The surname Dove is also sometimes an Anglicised form of the Scottish Gaelic MacCalmáin. The surname Dove is also sometimes a variant spelling of the surname Duff (a surname of multiple etymological origins). The surname Dove is also sometimes derived from the Middle Low German dōf, and originated as a nickname for a deaf man.

People
 Arthur Dove (1880–1946), American artist
 Billie Dove (1903–1997),  American actress
 Bob Dove (1921–2006), American football player
 Charlie Dove ((1879–?), English footballer
 Craig Dove (born 1983), English football midfielder
 Daniel Dove (born 1994), Canadian rapper
 Daphna Dove (born 1975), American rock singer
 Dennis Dove (born 1981), American baseball pitcher
 Dove Gregory (1837–1873), English cricketer
 Ed Dove (born 1937), American football player
 Evelyn Dove (1902–1987), British singer and actress
 Frank Dove (1897–1957), British boxer
 Hamisi Amani-Dove (born 1974), American football (soccer) player
 Heinrich Wilhelm Dove (1803–1879), Prussian physicist, meteorologist
 Horace Dove-Edwin (born 1967), Sierra Leonean sprinter
 Jane Thurgood-Dove (1963–1997), murder victim
 John Dove (d. 1664/5), an English politician during the Civil War and the Interregnum 
 Jonathan Dove (born 1959), British composer of opera, choral works
 Lillian Singleton Dove (c. 1895–1975), African-American physician
 Mabel Dove Danquah (1905–1984), Gold Coast-born journalist, political activist and creative writer
 Marcus  Dove (born 1985), American basketball player
 Marmaduke Dove, American politician
 Nah Dove (born 1940s), Ghanaian-British author, lecturer and scholar in African-American studies
 Patricia M. Dove, American mineralogist
 Patrick Edward Dove (1815–1873), Scottish writer
 Rita Dove (born 1952), American poet, author
 Ronnie Dove (born 1935), American country and pop singer
 Toni Dove, American artist
 Ulysses Dove (1947–1996), American choreographer

References

Surnames from nicknames